R v Coney (1882) 8 QBD 534 is an English case in which the Court for Crown Cases Reserved found that a bare-knuckle fight was an assault occasioning actual bodily harm, despite the consent of the participants. This marked the end of widespread public bare-knuckle contests in England.

The case also found that voluntary attendance as a spectator was evidence that could be put to the jury to support a charge of aiding and abetting the assault. It was found however that an ordinary citizen is not under any duty to prevent an offence being committed and that failing to prevent it does not create liability as an accomplice.

Application
The principles laid down have been applied or nuanced (distinguished) in consensual crime precedents.  See R v Brown for a selection of scenarios in which the prohibition of actual bodily harm applies and where, for example in running the risk of ABH in less risky sports, it does not.

Judges
John Coleridge, 1st Baron Coleridge

See also
English criminal law
R v Clarkson (David) [1971]

External links
Pugilistic Prosecutions: Prize Fighting and the Courts in Nineteenth Century Britain by Jack Anderson

Bare-knuckle boxing
C
Coney
1882 in England
1882 in British law